Evan Wade Finney  (born December 9, 1994) is an American soccer player who plays as a goalkeeper.

Career

Youth 
Finney spent two season playing at the IMG Academy from 2011-2013 where he won Goalkeeper Of The Year in 2012.

College and Amateur 
Finney played college soccer at Penn State University between 2013 and 2017, making just 27 appearances during his time with the Nittany Lions due to injuries. Finney won a Big Ten Conference championship in 2013, was a two-time Academic All-B1G selection, a B1G First Team All Tournament Team Selection in 2015, and a two-time Big Ten Defensive player of the week winner in 2016. 

Finney also played with USL Premier Development League side IMG Academy Bradenton in 2017.

Professional 
On February 11, 2019, Finney signed for Real Monarchs of the USL Championship. While with the Monarchs, Finney won a USL Championship Western Conference Title and a USL Championship Final.

References

External links 
 Real Salt Lake 

1994 births
Living people
American soccer players
Association football goalkeepers
IMG Academy Bradenton players
Penn State Nittany Lions men's soccer players
Real Monarchs players
Soccer players from California
USL Championship players
USL League Two players